On January 6, 2021, following the defeat of U.S. President Donald Trump in the 2020 presidential election, a mob of his supporters attacked the United States Capitol Building in Washington, D.C. The mob sought to keep Trump in power by preventing a joint session of Congress from counting the electoral college votes to formalize the victory of President-elect Joe Biden. According to the House select committee investigating the incident, the attack was the culmination of a seven-part plan by Trump to overturn the election. Five people died either shortly before, during, or following the event: one was shot by Capitol Police, another died of a drug overdose, and three died of natural causes. Many people were injured, including 138 police officers. Four officers who responded to the attack died by suicide within seven months.  monetary damages caused by attackers exceed $2.7 million. 

Called to action by Trump, thousands of his supporters gathered in Washington, D.C., on January5 and6 to support his false claim that the 2020 election had been "stolen by emboldened radical-left Democrats" and to demand that Vice President Mike Pence and the Congress reject Biden's victory. Starting at noon on January 6, at a "Save America" rally on the Ellipse, Trump repeated false claims of election irregularities and said "If you don't fight like hell, you're not going to have a country anymore." In the same speech, he said "I know that everyone here will soon be marching over to the Capitol building to peacefully and patriotically make your voices heard." During and after his speech, thousands of attendees, some armed, walked to the Capitol, and hundreds breached police perimeters as Congress was beginning the electoral vote count.

More than 2,000 rioters entered the building, many of whom occupied, vandalized, and looted; assaulted Capitol Police officers and reporters; and attempted to locate lawmakers to capture and harm. A gallows was erected west of the Capitol, and some rioters chanted "Hang Mike Pence" after he rejected false claims by Trump and others that the vice president could overturn the election results. Some vandalized and looted the offices of House Speaker Nancy Pelosi and other members of Congress. With building security breached, Capitol Police evacuated and locked down both chambers of Congress and several buildings in the Capitol Complex. Rioters occupied the empty Senate chamber while federal law enforcement officers defended the evacuated House floor. Pipe bombs were found at each of the Democratic National Committee and Republican National Committee headquarters, and Molotov cocktails were discovered in a vehicle near the Capitol.

Trump resisted sending the National Guard to quell the mob. Later that afternoon, in a Twitter video, he reasserted that the election was "fraudulent", but told his supporters to "go home in peace". The Capitol was clear of rioters by mid-evening, and the counting of the electoral votes resumed and was completed in the early morning hours of January 7. Pence declared President-elect Biden and Vice President-elect Kamala Harris victorious. Pressured by his cabinet, the threat of removal, and many resignations, Trump later committed to an orderly transition of power in a televised statement.

A week after the riot, the House of Representatives impeached Trump for incitement of insurrection, making him the only U.S. president to have been impeached twice. In February, after Trump had left office, the Senate voted 57–43 in favor of conviction; because this fell short of a two-thirds majority, requiring 67 votes, he was acquitted for a second time. The House passed a bill to create a bipartisan independent commission to investigate the attack, modeled after the 9/11 Commission, but it was blocked by Republicans in the Senate, so the House approved a select committee with seven Democrats and two Republicans to investigate instead. The committee held nine televised public hearings on the attack  in 2022, and later voted to subpoena Trump. By March 2022, the Justice Department's investigations had expanded to include the activities of others leading up to the attack.  Ultimately, the Committee recommended Trump to DOJ to be prosecuted for obstructing an official proceeding, incitement, conspiracy to defraud the United States, and making false statements.

More than 30 members of anti-government groups, including the Oath Keepers, Proud Boys, and Three Percenters, were charged with conspiracy for allegedly planning their attacks on the Capitol; ten Oath Keepers and five Proud Boys were charged with seditious conspiracy, and one Oath Keeper pleaded guilty. Oath Keeper leader Stewart Rhodes would later be convicted of seditious conspiracy. , at least 57 people with roles in the day's events were running for public office. Although most people charged with crimes relating to the attack had no known affiliation with far-right or extremist groups, a significant number were linked to extremist groups or conspiratorial movements. By January 2023, at least 476 individuals charged had pleaded guilty.

Background

Attempts to overturn the presidential election 

Democrat Joe Biden defeated incumbent Republican Donald Trump in the 2020 United States presidential election. Trump and other Republicans attempted to overturn the election, falsely claiming widespread voter fraud.

Within hours after the closing of the polls, while votes were still being tabulated, Trump declared victory, demanding that further counting be halted. He began a campaign to subvert the election, through legal challenges and an extralegal effort. Trump's lawyers had concluded within ten days after the election that legal challenges to the election results had no factual basis or legal merit. Despite those analyses, he sought to overturn the results by filing at least sixty lawsuits, including two brought to the Supreme Court. Those actions sought to nullify election certifications and to void votes that had been cast for Biden. Those challenges were all rejected by the courts for lack of evidence or the absence of legal standing.

Trump then mounted a campaign to pressure Republican governors, secretaries of state, and state legislatures to nullify results by replacing slates of Biden electors with those declared to Trump, or by manufacturing evidence of fraud. He further demanded that lawmakers investigate ostensible election "irregularities" such as by conducting signature matches of mailed-in ballots, disregarding any prior analytic efforts. Trump also personally made inquiries proposing the invocation of martial law to "re-run" or reverse the election and the appointment of a special counsel to find instances of fraud, despite conclusions by federal and state officials that such cases were few and isolated or non-existent. Trump ultimately undertook neither step. Trump repeatedly urged Vice President Mike Pence to alter the results and to stop Biden from taking office. None of those actions would have been within Pence's constitutional powers as vice president and president of the Senate. Trump repeated this call in his rally speech on the morning of January 6.

Numerous scholars, historians, political scientists, and journalists have characterized these efforts to overturn the election as an attempted self-coup by Trump and an implementation of the big lie.

Planning 
Congress was scheduled to meet jointly on January 6 to certify the winner of the Electoral College vote, typically a ceremonial affair. In December, Congressman Mo Brooks (R-AL) organized three White House meetings between Trump, Republican lawmakers, and others. Attendees included Trump, Vice President Pence, representatives Jody Hice (R-GA), Jim Jordan (R-OH), and Andy Biggs (R-AZ), representative-elect Marjorie Taylor Greene (R-GA), and members of the Trump legal team. The purpose of the meetings was to strategize about how Congress could overturn the election results on January 6.

On December 18, four days after the Electoral College voted, Trump called for supporters to attend a rally before the January6 Congressional vote count to continue his challenge to the validity of several states' election results. Trump tweeted, "Big protest in D.C. on January 6th. Be there, will be wild!" The "March to Save America" and rally that preceded the riots at the Capitol were initially organized by Women for America First, a 501(c)(4) organization chaired by Amy Kremer, co-founder of Women for Trump. On January 1, 2021, they obtained a permit with an estimated attendance of 5,000 for a first amendment rally "March for Trump". In late 2020 and early 2021, Kremer organized and spoke at a series of events across the country as part of a bus tour to encourage attendance at the January6 rally and support Trump's efforts to overturn the election result. Women for America First invited its supporters to join a caravan of vehicles traveling to the event. Event management was carried out by Event Strategies, a company founded by Tim Unes, who worked for Trump's 2016 presidential campaign.

On January 2, Trump retweeted a post by Kremer promoting the January6 rally, adding that he would be there. From that point, although Kremer still held the permit, planning essentially passed to the White House. Trump discussed the speaking lineup and the music to be played at the event. Although the initial plan for the rally called for people to remain at the Ellipse until the counting of electoral slates was complete, the White House said they should march to the Capitol, as Trump repeatedly urged during his speech.

Ali Alexander, a right-wing political activist who took part in organizing the rally and expressed support for the storming as "completely peaceful", was reported as saying in December that Representatives Paul Gosar (R–AZ), Andy Biggs (R–AZ), and Mo Brooks (R–AL) were involved in the planning of "something big". "We're the four guys who came up with a January6 event", he said. According to Alexander, "It was to build momentum and pressure and then on the day change hearts and minds of Congress peoples who weren't yet decided or who saw everyone outside and said, 'I can't be on the other side of that mob. His remarks received more scrutiny after the events of January 6, causing Biggs to respond with a statement denying any relationship with Alexander. The Washington Post wrote that videos and posts revealed earlier connections between Alexander and the three members of Congress. Alexander said in April 2022 that he would cooperate with the Justice Department investigation into the attack, after receiving a subpoena from a federal grand jury that was investigating broad categories of people involved in Trump rallies prior to the attack. Alexander was close to longtime Trump associate Roger Stone, with whom he spoke about "logistics" and the "warring factions" of rally organizers in the run up to January 6. Alexander gave the January 6 committee all of his communications with Stone from the day of the attack.

For several weeks before the event, there were over one million mentions of storming the capitol on social media, including calls for violence against Congress, Pence, and police. This was done on "alt-tech" platforms such as news aggregator website Patriots.win, chat app Telegram and Twitter-like microblogging websites Gab and Parler, as well as on mainstream social media platforms, such as TikTok. Many of the posters planned for violence before the event; some discussed how to avoid police on the streets, which tools to bring to help pry open doors, and how to smuggle weapons into the city. They discussed their perceived need to attack the police. Following clashes with Washington, D.C., police during protests on December 12, 2020, the Proud Boys and other far-right groups turned against supporting law enforcement. At least one group, Stop the Steal, posted on December 23, 2020, its plans to occupy the Capitol with promises to "escalate" if opposed by police. Multiple sites graphically and explicitly discussed "war", physically taking charge at the event, and killing politicians, even soliciting opinions about which politician should be hanged first, with a GIF of a noose. Joan Donovan, research director at Harvard's Shorenstein Center on Media, Politics and Public Policy, said that key figures in the Unite the Right rally and the Gamergate online harassment campaign worked to raise online fury ahead of the attack. Facebook and Twitter have also been cited as playing a role in the fomenting of the Capitol attack.

On the January 4, 2021, edition of Real America's Voice's The War Room (podcast), Steve Bannon, while discussing the planning for the upcoming events and speech by Trump on January 6 at The Ellipse, said: "Live from our nation's capital, you're in the field headquarters of one of the small divisions of the bloodless coup."

On January 5, the Norfolk field office of the FBI reported plans of violence: "An online thread discussed specific calls for violence to include stating 'Be ready to fight. Congress needs to hear glass breaking, doors being kicked in, and blood from their BLM and Pantifa slave soldiers being spilled. Get violent. Stop calling this a march, or rally, or a protest. Go there ready for war. We get our President or we die. NOTHING else will achieve this goal.'" The Norfolk report noted that planners shared a map of the tunnels underneath the Capitol. Another comment, cited in the FBI memo, advocated for Trump supporters going to Washington "to get violent to stop this, especially the antifa maggots who are sure to come out en masse even if we get the Prez for 4 more years". On December 26, a leader of the Oath Keepers allegedly messaged instructions to "wait for the 6th when we are all in D.C. to insurrection." According to prosecutors, that leader also authored a message in December reporting, "I organized an alliance between Oath Keepers, Florida 3%ers, and Proud Boys." Leaders of the Proud Boys, the Oath Keepers and Latinos for Trump met near the Phoenix Park Hotel in a parking garage on January 5, although several of those present claim to have not discussed matters related to planning for January 6. A PDF document titled "1776 Returns" circulated among the Proud Boys organization, which laid out a plan for the occupation of key buildings in the United States Capitol Complex.

NBC News reported in June 2021 that the FBI had been asking at least one person charged with involvement in the attack about his possible connections to members of Congress. His trial was set for April 4, 2022. In May 2022, he was found guilty.

Funding 
Organizations taking part in the event included: Black Conservatives Fund, Eighty Percent Coalition, Moms For America, Peaceably Gather, Phyllis Schlafly Eagles, Rule of Law Defense Fund, Stop The Steal, Turning Point Action, Tea Party Patriots, Women For America First, and Wildprotest.com. The Rule of Law Defense Fund, a 501(c)(4) arm of the Republican Attorneys General Association, also paid for robocalls to invite people to "march to the Capitol building and call on Congress to stop the steal". Conspiracy theorist Alex Jones's media company paid $500,000 to book the Ellipse for the event, some of which was donated by Publix heiress and prominent Trump donor Julie Jenkins Fancelli whose total contribution to the event was about $650,000. Jones claimed that the Trump White House asked him to lead the march to the Capitol. Charlie Kirk tweeted that Turning Point Action and Students for Trump had sent over eighty buses to the Capitol. Roger Stone recorded a video for Stop The Steal Security Project to raise funds "for the staging, the transportation and most importantly the security" of the event. Other people attempted to raise funds in December via GoFundMe to help pay for transportation to the rally, with limited success. An investigation by BuzzFeed News identified more than a dozen fundraisers to pay for travel to the planned rally. GoFundMe subsequently deactivated several of the campaigns after the riot, but some campaigns had already raised part or all of their fundraising goals before deactivation.

January 5 meeting 
Trump's closest allies, including Michael Flynn, Corey Lewandowski, Alabama Senator Tommy Tuberville, and Trump's sons Donald Jr. and Eric, met at the Trump International Hotel in Washington, D.C., on the evening of January 5. Tuberville has since said that he did not attend the meeting, despite having being photographed in the hotel's lobby. According to Charles Herbster, who said he attended the meeting himself, attendees included Tuberville, Adam Piper and Peter Navarro. Daniel Beck wrote that "Fifteen of us spent the evening with Donald Trump Jr., Kimberly Guilfoyle, Tommy Tuberville, Mike Lindell, Peter Navarro, and Rudy Giuliani". Herbster claimed to be standing "in the private residence of the President at Trump International with the following patriots who are joining me in a battle for justice and truth". He added David Bossie to the list of attendees.

Public predictions of violence 

In 2019, Kara Swisher, a columnist for The New York Times, envisioned what would happen "if Mr. Trump loses the 2020 election and tweets inaccurately the next day that there had been widespread fraud and, moreover, that people should rise up in armed insurrection to keep him in office". In early September 2020, YouTuber and political commentator Tim Pool said in a recorded conversation that "I've had messages from people saying that they've already got plans to rush to D.C. as soon as Nov. 3 goes chaotic", and that, "The right-wing militias, the Oath Keepers, the Three Percenters, and just the Proud Boys and Trump supporters, they are going to rush full-speed to D.C. They are going to take the White House and do whatever they can and paramilitary". On December 1, 2020, a Georgia election official publicly warned, "Stop inspiring people to commit potential acts of violence. Someone's going to get hurt. Someone's going to get shot. Someone's going to get killed".

On December 21, 2020, a viral tweet predicted, "On January 6, armed Trumpist militias will be rallying in D.C., at Trump's orders. It's highly likely that they'll try to storm the Capitol after it certifies Joe Biden's win." On December 29, 2020, D.C.'s Hotel Harrington, a past gathering spot for Proud Boys, announced closure from January 4–6, citing public safety. Harry's Pub, another Proud Boys hotspot, similarly announced a temporary closure. On December 30, 2020, former Pence aide Olivia Troye publicly expressed fears "that violence could erupt in Washington, D.C., on January 6".

A January 2 article by The Daily Beast reported protesters were discussing bringing guns to the District, breaking into federal buildings, and attacking law enforcement. The article quoted one popular comment "I'm thinking it will be literal war on that day. Where we'll storm offices and physically remove and even kill all the D.C. traitors and reclaim the country".

Official predictions and warnings 

In the days leading up to the attack, several organizations monitoring online extremism had been issuing warnings about the event. In an internal report dated December 29, 2020, the Federal Bureau of Investigation's (FBI) Minneapolis field office warned of armed protests at every state capitol, orchestrated by the far-right boogaloo movement, before Biden's inauguration. Before January 6, 2021, the FBI notified the local Joint Terrorism Task Force of possible impending violence at the Capitol. The Washington Post reported an internal FBI document on January5 warned of rioters preparing to travel to Washington and setting up staging areas in various regional states. The FBI did not distribute a formal intelligence bulletin. Some security specialists later reported they had been surprised that they had not received information from the FBI and DHS before the event.

Robert Contee, the acting Chief of the Metropolitan Police Department of the District of Columbia, said after the event that his department had possessed no intelligence indicating the Capitol would be breached. Capitol Police chief Steven Sund said his department had developed a plan to respond to "First Amendment activities" but had not planned for the "criminal riotous behavior" they encountered. Three days before the Capitol attack, the Capitol Police intelligence unit had circulated an internal memo warning that Trump supporters "see January 6, 2021, as the last opportunity to overturn the results of the presidential election" and could use violence against "Congress itself" on that date. Sund said he directed the department to be placed on "all hands on deck" status (contrary to early reports), which meant every sworn officer would be working. He also said he activated seven Civil Disturbance Unit platoons, approximately 250 officers, with four of those platoons equipped in helmets, protective clothing, and shields. U.S. Secretary of the Army Ryan D. McCarthy said law enforcement agencies' estimates of the potential size of the crowd, calculated in advance of the event, varied between 2,000 and 80,000. On January 5, the National Park Service estimated that thirty thousand people would attend the "Save America" rally, based on people already in the area.

Other organizations, such as the Anti-Defamation League, British security firm G4S, and nonpartisan governance watchdog Advance Democracy, Inc., studied QAnon posts and made various warnings of the potential of violence on January6.

Law enforcement preparations

Trump supporters gather in D.C.
On January 5, several events related to overturning the election occurred in or around the National Mall in Washington, D.C. The founder of the Eighty Percent Coalition organized the "Rally to Revival", which was permitted to take place at Freedom Plaza including a "Rally to Save America".

On January 5, the "Save the Republic Rally" was organized by Moms for America in the early afternoon at Area9 across from the Russell Senate Office Building;

On January 5, the "One Nation Under God" rally, organized by Virginia Women for Trump, Stop the Steal, American Phoenix Project, and Jericho March, took place near the United States Supreme Court.

James Ray Epps, an individual with history in the Arizona Oath Keepers, was filmed during two street gatherings on January 5 urging people to go into the Capitol the next day. Epps later stated that he had helped orchestrate the flow into the Capitol building.

A rally was organized by a recently defeated Republican congressional candidate from South Carolina. It was scheduled for 250 people and permitted in the North Inner Gravel Walkway between 13th and 14th Streets within the National Mall and featured a  replica of the U.S. Constitution.
These events took place on January5 and6. At least ten people were arrested, several on weapons charges, on the night of January5 and into the morning of January 6.

On January 6, the "Wild Protest" was organized by Stop The Steal and took place in Area8, across from the Russell Senate Office Building.

On January 6, the "Freedom Rally" was organized by Virginia Freedom Keepers, Latinos for Trump, and United Medical Freedom Super PAC at 300 First Street NE, across from the Russell Senate Office Building.

Freedom Plaza rallies 
The Freedom Plaza rallies were held at the northwest corner of 14th Street and Pennsylvania Avenue, just east of the White House. A series of three consecutive events were planned, first a "March to Save America" rally from 1:00 to 2:00p.m., followed by a "Stop the Steal" rally from 3:30 to 5:00 and an "Eighty Percent Coalition" rally from 5:00 to 8:30. Several speakers were presented, notably including:

 Matt Maddock (R), MI State Representative from Milford
 Vernon Jones (D/R), former GA State Representative
 Alex Jones, conservative radio host and conspiracy theorist
 Michael Flynn, former National Security Advisor to President Trump
 George Papadopoulos (R), Trump Campaign Advisor
 Roger Stone, advisor to President Trump

Bombs placed

At 7:40p.m. on January 5, someone wearing a gray hooded sweatshirt, a mask, and Nike Air Max Speed Turf sneakers was filmed carrying a bag through a residential neighborhood on South Capitol Street. At 7:52p.m., the individual was recorded sitting on a bench outside the DNC; the next day, a pipe bomb was discovered there, placed under a bush. In the footage, the suspect appears to zip a bag, stand and walk away. At 8:14, they were filmed in an alley near the RNC, where a second pipe bomb was found the following day. They placed both bombs within a few blocks of the Capitol.
The FBI distributed photos and video of the person who they believe planted the devices and offered an initial reward of up to $50,000 for information; by the end of the month, the FBI raised it to $75,000, and then $100,000. As of 2023, nearing the 2-year-anniversary since the events, the overall reward price has been upped to $500,000. Vice President-elect Kamala Harris was inside the DNC building when the pipe bomb was discovered outside the facility. Both pipe bombs were fully functional and were disabled by authorities. The incident diverted attention and resources away from the Capitol Riot, which quickly spiraled out of control.

No suspects have been named in the incident as of January 2023.

January 6 Trump rally  

The "Save America" rally (or "March to Save America", promoted as a "Save America March") took place on January6 in the Ellipse within the National Mall just south of the White House. The permit granted to Women for America First showed their first amendment rally "March for Trump" with speeches running from 9:00a.m. to 3:30p.m., and an additional hour for the conclusion of the rally and dispersal of participants.

Trump supporters gathered on the Ellipse to hear speeches from Trump, Rudy Giuliani, and others, such as Chapman University School of Law professor John C. Eastman, who spoke, at least in part, based on his memorandums, which have been described as an instruction manual for a coup d'état. In a court filing in February, a member of the Oath Keepers claimed she had acted as "security" at the rally, and was provided with a "VIP pass to the rally where she met with Secret Service agents". The U.S. Secret Service denied that any private citizens had coordinated with it to provide security on January 6. On February 22, she changed her story and said she interacted with the Secret Service only as she passed through the security check before the rally.

Mo Brooks (R-AL) was a featured speaker at the rally and spoke around 9 a.m., where he said, "Today is the day American patriots start taking down names and kicking ass". And later, "Are you willing to do what it takes to fight for America? Louder! Will you fight for America?"

Representative Madison Cawthorn (R–NC) said, "This crowd has some fight". Amy Kremer told attendees, "it is up to you and I to save this Republic" and called on them to "keep up the fight".
Trump's sons, Donald Jr. and Eric, along with Eric's wife Lara Trump, also spoke, naming and verbally attacking Republican congressmen and senators who were not supporting the effort to challenge the Electoral College vote, and promising to campaign against them in future primary elections. Donald Jr. said of Republican lawmakers, "If you're gonna be the zero and not the hero, we're coming for you".

Rudy Giuliani repeated conspiracy theories that voting machines used in the election were "crooked" and at 10:50 called for "trial by combat". Eastman asserted that balloting machines contained "secret folders" that altered voting results. At 10:58, a Proud Boys contingent left the rally and marched toward the Capitol Building.

Donald Trump's speech 

Starting at 11:58, from behind a bulletproof shield, President Trump gave a speech, declaring that he would "never concede" the election, criticized the media, and called for Pence to overturn the election results, something outside Pence's constitutional power. His speech contained many falsehoods and misrepresentations that inflamed the crowd. Trump did not overtly call on his supporters to use violence or enter the Capitol, but his speech was filled with violent imagery and Trump suggested that his supporters had the power to prevent Biden from taking office. The same afternoon, Pence released a letter to Congress in which he said he could not challenge Biden's victory.

Trump called for his supporters to "walk down to the Capitol" to "cheer on our brave senators and congressmen and women and we're probably not going to be cheering so much for some of them." He told the crowd that he would be with them, but he ultimately did not go to the Capitol. As to counting Biden's electoral votes, Trump said, "We can't let that happen" and suggested Biden would be an "illegitimate president". Referring to the day of the elections, Trump said, "most people would stand there at 9:00 in the evening and say, 'I want to thank you very much,' and they go off to some other life, but I said, 'Something's wrong here. Something's really wrong. [It] can't have happened.' And we fight. We fight like Hell and if you don't fight like Hell, you're not going to have a country anymore". He said the protesters would be "going to the Capitol and we're going to try and give [Republicans] the kind of pride and boldness that they need to take back our country". Trump also said, "you'll never take back our country with weakness. You have to show strength and you have to be strong. We have come to demand that Congress do the right thing and only count the electors who have been lawfully slated".

Trump denounced Representative Liz Cheney (R-WY), saying, "We've got to get rid of the weak Congresspeople, the ones that aren't any good, the Liz Cheneys of the world". He called upon his supporters to "fight much harder" against "bad people"; told the crowd that "you are allowed to go by very different rules," said that his supporters were "not going to take it any longer"; framed the moment as the last stand, suggested that Pence and other Republican officials put themselves in danger by accepting Biden's victory; and told the crowd he would march with them to the Capitol, but was prevented from doing so by his security detail. In addition to the twenty times he used the term "fight," Trump once used the term "peacefully," saying, "I know that everyone here will soon be marching over to the Capitol building to peacefully and patriotically make your voices heard".

During Trump's speech, his supporters chanted "Take the Capitol," "Taking the Capitol right now," "Invade the Capitol," "Storm the Capitol" and "Fight for Trump". The New York Times placed the fall of the first barriers at 1:03p.m. Before Trump had finished speaking at 1:12p.m., an estimated eight thousand supporters had already begun moving up the National Mall, with some shouting that they were storming the Capitol. After completing his speech, Trump went back to the White House on the presidential motorcade, arriving at 1:19 p.m. At some point afterward, Trump went to the Oval Office and started watching news coverage of the attack.

Trump's knowledge of weapons in the crowd 

During the rally, Trump knew some of his supporters were armed and demanded that they be allowed to enter the rally, and later instructed the crowd to march on the US Capitol. In a December 21, 2021, statement, Trump falsely called the attack a "completely unarmed protest". The Department of Justice said in a January 2022 official statement that over 75 people had been charged, in relation to the attack, with entering a restricted area with "a dangerous or deadly weapon", including some armed with guns, stun guns, knives, batons, baseball bats, axes, and chemical sprays. According to testimony from Cassidy Hutchinson, a Secret Service official had warned Trump that protestors were carrying weapons, but Trump wanted the magnetometers used to detect metallic weapons removed so armed supporters could enter the rally. According to Hutchinson, when warned, Trump said:

Attack on the Capitol
During his January 6 speech, President Trump called upon supporters to walk to the Capitol. Just before the attack, pipe bombs were discovered near the complex. Attackers besieged and ultimately breached the Capitol. Members of the Congress barricaded themselves in the chamber, and one attacker was fatally shot by police while attempting to breach a barricade.

After officials at the Pentagon delayed deployment of the National Guard citing concerns about optics, D.C. Mayor Bowser requested assistance from the Governor of Virginia. By 3:15, Virginia state police began arriving in D.C. After Vice President Pence and the Congress were evacuated to secure locations, law enforcement cleared and secured the Capitol.

March to the Capitol 

On January 6, Trump supporters filled The Ellipse, about 1.6 miles (2.6 km) from the Capitol, just south of the White House grounds. Signs around the stage carried the slogan "Save America March". Speeches began at 9:00. While they continued, a Proud Boys contingent left the rally at 10:58 to march toward the Capitol Building. As they set off, Ethan Nordean used a megaphone to issue instructions and said: "if you're not a Proud Boy, please get out of the way". Another leader, Joe Biggs, used a walkie-talkie for communications.

President Trump arrived and began speaking around noon. Throughout his speech, he encouraged the crowd to walk down Pennsylvania Avenue to the Capitol. Before he had finished speaking, members of the crowd began walking to the Capitol "in a steady stream".
Around 12:30, a "fairly calm" crowd of about 300 built up east of the Capitol. Senator Josh Hawley (R-MO), a leader of the group of lawmakers who vowed to challenge the Electoral College vote, greeted these protesters with a raised fist as he passed by on his way to the Congress joint session in the early afternoon.

Bombs discovered near Capitol Complex

Siege 

The Proud Boys contingent reached the west perimeter of the Capitol grounds, protected only by a sparse line of police in front of a temporary fence. Other Trump supporters arrived, forming a growing crowd. The mob, headed by Proud Boy Joe Biggs, rushed the fences and clashed with the police. At 12:53, rioters stormed through the barriers and onto the Capitol grounds for the first time, as police struggled to contain them. Meanwhile, at The Ellipse, Oath Keepers wearing black hoodies with prominent logos left the rally at 12:52 and changed into Army Combat Uniforms, with helmets, on their way to the Capitol.

Around 1:00 p.m., hundreds of Trump supporters clashed with a second thin line of officers and pushed through barriers erected along the perimeter of the Capitol. The crowd swept past barriers and officers, with some members of the mob spraying officers with chemical agents or hitting them with lead pipes. Many rioters walked up the external stairways, while some resorted to ropes and makeshift ladders. Police blocked the entrance to a tunnel at the lower west terrace where rioters waged a three-hour fight to enter. To gain access to the Capitol, several rioters scaled the west wall. Representative Zoe Lofgren (D–CA), aware that rioters had reached the Capitol steps, could not reach Steven Sund by phone; House Sergeant-at-Arms Paul D. Irving told Lofgren the doors to the Capitol were locked and "nobody can get in".

Telephone logs released by USCP show that Sund had been coordinating additional resources from various agencies. Sund's first call was to the D.C. Metropolitan Police, who arrived within 15 minutes. Sund called Irving and Stenger at 12:58 and asked them for an emergency declaration required to call in the National Guard; they both told Sund they would "run it up the chain", but formal approval would arrive more than one hour later.

After Trump had finished his speech, around 1:12, he returned to the White House despite promising to march with protestors to the Capitol.

A reliable estimate of the total size of the crowd cannot be ascertained, as aerial photos are not permitted in Washington, D.C., for reasons of security, but the crowd was estimated to be in the thousands. At 1:50p.m., the on-scene MPD incident commander declared a riot.
At 1:58, Capitol Police officers removed a barricade on the northeast side of the Capitol allowing hundreds of protestors to stream onto the grounds.

Capitol breach 

Just before 2:00p.m., numerous rioters reached the doors and windows of the Capitol and began attempts to break in. Around 2:11, a group of rioters used a piece of lumber to break through a window and began climbing into the building moments later. At 2:12, a Proud Boy seized a Capitol Police plastic shield and used it to smash through another window; by 2:13, the Capitol was officially breached, and the growing mob streamed into the National Statuary Hall. Although most of the Capitol's windows had been reinforced, the rioters targeted those that remained as single-pane glass and could be broken easily.

As rioters began to invade the Capitol and other nearby buildings, some buildings in the complex were evacuated. Outside, the mob punctured the tires of a police vehicle, and left a note saying "PELOSI IS SATAN" on the windshield. Politico reported some rioters briefly showing their police badges or military identification to law enforcement as they approached the Capitol, expecting to be let inside; a Capitol Police officer told BuzzFeed News that one rioter had told him "[w]e're doing this for you" as he flashed a badge.

Concerned about the approaching mob, Representative Maxine Waters (D-CA) called Capitol Police Chief Steven Sund, who was not on Capitol grounds but at the police department's headquarters. When asked what the Capitol Police were doing to stop the rioters, Sund told Waters, "We're doing the best we can" before the line went dead.

Federal officials estimate that about ten thousand rioters entered the Capitol grounds, and the Secret Service and FBI have estimated that about 1,200 breached the building. A news crew from British broadcaster ITV followed the rioters into the Capitol, the only broadcaster to do so.

More than 800 video and audio filesincluding D.C. Metropolitan Police radio transmissions, Capitol Police body-worn camera footage, and Capitol surveillance camera footagewere later obtained as evidence in Trump's impeachment trial. The evidence showed that the assailants launched a large and coordinated attack; for example, "Security camera footage near the House chamber shows the rioters waving in reinforcements to come around the corner. Another video shows more than 150 rioters charging through a breached entrance in just a minute-and-a-half". While assaulting the Capitol, the crowd chanted "Fight, Fight"; "Stop the steal"; and "Fight for Trump". As they were overrun by a violent mob, the police acted with restraint and pleaded for backup. Many of the attackers employed tactics, body armor and technology (such as two-way radio headsets) similar to those of the very police they were confronting. Some rioters wore riot gear, including helmets and military-style vests. A pair of rioters carried plastic handcuffs, which they found on a table inside the Capitol. In an analysis of later court documents, it was reported that at least 85 participants in the riot were charged with carrying or using a weapon, such as guns, knives, axes, chemical sprays, police gear, and/or stun guns, in the riots to assault others or break objects. It is also illegal to brandish weapons at the Capitol.

Some of the rioters carried American flags, Confederate battle flags, or Nazi emblems. For the first time in U.S. history, a Confederate battle flag was displayed inside the Capitol. Christian imagery and rhetoric were prevalent, with rioters carrying crosses and signs saying, "Jesus Saves", and "Jesus 2020". On the National Mall, rioters chanted, "Christ is king". One rioter carried a Christian flag. Rioters referred to the neo-fascist Proud Boys as "God's warriors". These were mainly neo-charismatic, prophetic Christians who believed that Trump was prophesied to remain in power and anointed by God to save Christian Americans from religious persecution.

Although a few evangelical leaders supported the riots, most condemned the violence and criticized Trump for inciting the crowd. This criticism came from liberal Christian groups such as the Red-Letter Christians, as well as evangelical groups who were generally supportive of Trump. This criticism did not affect evangelical support for Trump; investigative journalist Sarah Posner, author of Unholy: Why White Evangelicals Worship at the Altar of Donald Trump, argued that many white evangelical Christians in the U.S. create an echo chamber whereby Trump's missteps are blamed on the Democratic Party, leftists, or the mainstream media, the last of which being viewed as especially untrustworthy.

Senate adjourned 

At the time, the joint session of Congresswhich had already voted to accept the nine electoral votes from Alabama and three from Alaska without objectionwas split so that each chamber could separately consider an objection to accepting Arizona's electoral votes that had been raised by Representative Paul Gosar (R-AZ) and endorsed by Senator Ted Cruz (R-TX). Both chambers were roughly halfway through their two-hour debate on the motion.

While the debate over the Arizona electoral college votes continued, an armed police officer entered the Senate chamber, positioned facing the back entrance of the chamber. Pence handed the floor from Senator Kyrsten Sinema (D-AZ) to Senator James Lankford (R-OK). Moments later, Pence and his family were escorted out by Secret Service members. As rioters began to climb the stairs toward the Senate chamber, a lone Capitol Police officer, Eugene Goodman, worked to slow the mob down as he radioed that they had reached the second floor. Realizing he was steps away from the still-unsealed Senate chamber doors, Goodman then shoved a rioter, leading the mob as he ran into a line of reinforcements. Banging could be heard from outside as rioters attempted to breach the doors. As Lankford was speaking, the Senate was gaveled into recess, and the doors were locked at 2:15. A minute later, the rioters reached the gallery outside the chamber. A police officer carrying a semi-automatic weapon appeared on the floor and stood between then-Senate Majority Leader Mitch McConnell and then-Senate Minority Leader Chuck Schumer (D-NY). Senator Mitt Romney (R-UT) exasperatedly threw up his hands and directly criticized several fellow Republicans who were challenging President-elect Biden's electoral votes, yelling to them, "This is what you've gotten, guys". Several members of Senate parliamentarian Elizabeth MacDonough's staff carried the boxes of Electoral College votes and documentation out of the chamber to hidden safe rooms within the building.

Trump had made repeated false claims that the vice president had "unilateral authority" to reject electoral college votes and had pressured Pence to overturn the election results, but that morning Pence told Trump he refused to do so, after taking legal advice confirming that there was no such constitutional authority. At 2:24, Trump tweeted that Pence "didn't have the courage to do what should have been done". Later, Trump followers on far-right social media called for Pence to be hunted down, and the mob began chanting, "Where is Pence?" and "Find Mike Pence!" Outside, the mob chanted, "Hang Mike Pence!", which some crowds continued to chant as they stormed the Capitol; at least three rioters were overheard by a reporter saying they wanted to find Pence and execute him as a "traitor" by hanging him from a tree outside the building. According to witnesses, White House chief of staff Mark Meadows told coworkers that Trump complained about Pence being escorted to safety and then stated something suggesting that Pence should be hanged. All buildings in the complex were subsequently locked down, with no entry or exit from the buildings allowed. Capitol staff were asked to shelter in place; those outside were advised to "seek cover".

As the mob roamed the Capitol, lawmakers, aides, and staff took shelter in offices and closets. Aides to Mitch McConnell, barricaded in a room just off a hallway, heard a rioter outside the door "praying loudly", asking for "the evil of Congress [to] be brought to an end". The rioters entered and ransacked the office of the Senate Parliamentarian.

With senators still in the chamber, Trump called Senator Tommy Tuberville (R-AL) and told him to do more to block the counting of Biden's electoral votes, but the call had to be cut off when the Senate chamber was evacuated at 2:30. After evacuation, the mob briefly took control of the chamber, with some armed men carrying plastic handcuffs and others posing with raised fists on the Senate dais Pence had left minutes earlier. Pence's wife Karen Pence, daughter Charlotte Pence Bond, and brother Greg Pence (a member of the House; R–IN) were in the Capitol at the time it was attacked. It was reportedly intended for Pence to be evacuated from the Capitol Complex entirely, but he refused to do so, saying that seeing his "20-car motorcade fleeing ... would only vindicate their insurrection". Senior White House official, Keith Kellogg, told Anthony Ornato why Pence would not be evacuated, "You can't do that, Tony. Leave him where he's at. He's got a job to do. I know you guys too well. You'll fly him to Alaska if you have a chance. Don't do it." Kellogg made it clear that Pence would stay, even if he needed to remain all night."

Staff and reporters inside the building were taken by secure elevators to the basement and then to an underground bunker constructed following the attempted attack on the Capitol in 2001. Evacuees were redirected while en route after the bunker was also infiltrated by the mob.

Sergeant-at-Arms of the Senate Michael C. Stenger accompanied a group of senators including Lindsey Graham (R-SC) and Joe Manchin (D-WV) to a secure location in a Senate office building. Once safe, the lawmakers were "furious" with Stenger; Graham asked him, "How does this happen? How does this happen?" and added that they "[are] not going to be run out by a mob".

House recessed 

Meanwhile, in the House chamber around 2:15 pm., while Gosar was speaking, Speaker Pelosi was escorted out of the chamber. The House was gaveled into recess, but would resume a few minutes later. Amid the security concerns, Representative Dean Phillips (D–MN) yelled, "This is because of you!" at his Republican colleagues. The House resumed debate around 2:25. After Gosar finished speaking at 2:30, the House went into recess again after rioters had entered the House wing and were attempting to enter the Speaker's Lobby just outside the chamber. Lawmakers were still inside and being evacuated, with Pelosi, Kevin McCarthy, and a few others taken to a secure location. With violence breaking out, Capitol security advised members of Congress to take cover. Members of Congress inside the House chamber were told to don gas masks as law enforcement began using tear gas within the building.

ABC News reported that shots were fired within the Capitol. An armed standoff took place at the front door of the chamber of the House of Representatives: as the mob attempted to break in, federal law enforcement officers drew their guns inside and pointed them toward the chamber doors, which were barricaded with furniture. In a stairway, one officer fired a shot at a man coming toward him. Photographer Erin Schaff said that, from the Capitol Rotunda, she ran upstairs, where rioters grabbed her press badge. Police found her, and because her press pass had been stolen, held her at gunpoint before colleagues intervened.

The chief of staff for Representative Ayanna Pressley (D–MA) claimed that when the congresswoman and staff barricaded themselves in her office and attempted to call for help with duress buttons that they had previously used during safety drills, "[e]very panic button in my office had been torn outthe whole unit". Subsequently, a House Administration Committee emailed Greg Sargent of The Washington Post claiming the missing buttons were likely due to a "clerical screw-up" resulting from Pressley's swapping offices. Representative Jamaal Bowman (D-NY) tweeted that there were no duress buttons in his office, but acknowledged he was only three days into his term and they were installed a week later.

Multiple rioters, using the cameras on their cell phones, documented themselves occupying the Capitol and the offices of various representatives, vandalizing the offices of Speaker Pelosi, accessing secure computers, and stealing a laptop.

Congress reconvened

By 6 p.m., the building was cleared of rioters, and bomb squads swept the Capitol. At 7:15 p.m., Defense Secretary Miller told the leaders of Congress that they were cleared to return to the Capitol. At 8:06 p.m., Pence called the Senate back into session, and at 9 p.m., Pelosi did the same in the House. After debating and voting down two objections, Congress voted to confirm Biden's electoral college win at 3:24 a.m.

Participants and response

Groups 

The attackers included some of Trump's longtime and most fervent supporters from across the United States. The mob included Republican Party officials, current and former state legislators and political donors, far-right militants, white supremacists, conservative evangelical Christians and participants of the "Save America" Rally. According to the FBI, dozens of people on its terrorist watchlist were in D.C. for pro-Trump events on the 6th, with the majority being "suspected white supremacists". Some came heavily armed and some were convicted criminals, including a man who had been released from a Florida prison after serving a sentence for attempted murder. Although the anti-government Boogaloo movement mostly were opposing Donald Trump, a Boogaloo follower said several groups under his command helped storm the Capitol, taking the opportunity to strike against the federal government.

The Proud Boys played a much greater role in planning and coordinating the attack than was known in 2021. In 2022, new information appeared in testimony to the January 6th Committee and in a New York Times investigative video. The NYT video tracked individual Proud Boys throughout the insurrection, showing that they tactically coordinated their attacks "from the first moment of violence to multiple breaches of the Capitol while leaving the impression that it was just ordinary protesters leading the charge." Documentary film maker Nick Quested testified that he met up with about 300 Proud Boys at the Washington Monument at 10:30 and then they marched directly to the Capitol about a half-hour later, bypassing Trump's talk then in progress. Quested  said, in a separate NPR interview, that comments from one of the Proud Boys indicated the attack on the Capitol was planned:

The NYT video shows that the Proud Boys "worked as teams" and "Telegram messages from that morning show that some of the Proud Boys intend to rile up other protesters," included this exchange between Proud Boys members:

Separate testimony to the January 6th Committee by Capitol police officer Caroline Edwards described the first breach after the Proud Boys arrived.

The Capitol Hill police were vastly outnumbered: "...the mob on the west side eventually grew to at least 9,400 people, outnumbering officers by more than 58 to one." Video shown during the hearings showed Officer Edwards being pushed back behind a bicycle rack as Proud Boys pushed barricades towards her, knocking her off her feet and causing her to hit her head on the concrete steps.

The New York Times investigation found that the Proud Boys repeatedly used the same set of tactics: identifying access points to the building, riling up other protesters and sometimes directly joining in the violence. When met with resistance, leaders of the group reassessed, and teams of Proud Boys targeted new entry points to the Capitol." One of the first breaches—if not the first—of the Capitol was by Proud Boy Dominic Pezzola breaking in a window using a stolen police shield.

Another key revelation about the Proud Boys' plans came from an informant and concerned Mike Pence:

Also present during the riot were parts of the Black Hebrew Israelites, the National Anarchist Movement and the Blue Lives Matter movement; Supporters of the America First Movement, the Stop the Steal movement and the Patriot Movement; remnants of the Tea Party Movement and the Traditionalist Worker Party; QAnon followers; the Three Percenters, the Proud Boys, the Oath Keepers, the Groyper Army; as well as neo-Confederates, Christian nationalists and Holocaust deniers, among other far-right organizations and groups. Anti-Semitic, neo-Nazi group NSC-131 (Nationalist Social Club) was at the event, although it is unknown to what extent. Following the event, members of the group detailed their actions and claimed they were the "beginning of the start of White Revolution in the United States." After the storming, two white nationalists known for racist and anti-Semitic rhetoric streamed to their online followers a video posted on social media showing a man harassing an Israeli journalist seeking to conduct a live report outside the building.

Far-right emblematic gear was worn by some participants, including Neo-Nazi and Völkisch-inspired neopagan apparel, as well as a shirt emblazoned with references to the Auschwitz–Birkenau concentration camp and its motto, Arbeit macht frei. Shirts with references to famous internet meme Pepe the Frog were also seen, alongside "1776" and "MAGA civil war 2021" shirts, NSC-131 stickers, the valknut symbol, QAnon symbolism, as well as Oath Keepers and Proud Boys hats. Rioters were seen using the OK gesture, a gesture that had been famously co-opted as an alt-right dog whistle. Christian imagery, including a large "Jesus saves" banner, was seen in the crowd of demonstrators. Various other iconography was also on display, such as flags of other countries.

An academic analysis reported in The Atlantic in February 2021 found that of the 193 people so far arrested for invading the Capitol, 89 percent had no clear public connection to established far-right militias, known white-nationalist gangs, or any other known militant organizations. "The overwhelming reason for action, cited again and again in court documents, was that arrestees were following Trump's orders to keep Congress from certifying Joe Biden as the presidential-election winner." They were older than participants in previous far-right violent demonstrations and more likely to be employed, with 40% being business owners. The researchers concluded that these "middle-aged, middle-class insurrectionists" represented "a new force in American politicsnot merely a mix of right-wing organizations, but a broader mass political movement that has violence at its core and draws strength even from places where Trump supporters are in the minority."

The Associated Press reviewed public and online records of more than 120 participants after the storming and found that many of them shared conspiracy theories about the 2020 presidential election on social media and had also believed other QAnon and "deep state" conspiracy theories. Additionally, several had threatened Democratic and Republican politicians before the storming. The event was described as "Extremely Online," with "pro-Trump internet personalities" and fans streaming live footage while taking selfies.

According to The University of Maryland's National Consortium for the Study of Terrorism and Responses to Terrorism:

Some military personnel participated in the riot; the Department of Defense is investigating members on active and reserve duty who may have been involved in the riot. Nearly 20% of defendants charged in relation to the attack and about 12% of the participants in general were reported to have served in the military. A report from George Washington University and the Combating Terrorism Center said that "if anything... there actually is a very slight underrepresentation of veterans among the January 6 attackers." Police officers and a police chief from departments in multiple states are under investigation for their alleged involvement in the riot. As of January 25, at least 39 law enforcement officers are suspected of participating in Trump's pre-riot rally, or joining the Capitol riots, or both. Two Capitol Police officers were suspended, one for directing rioters inside the building while wearing a Make America Great Again hat, and the other for taking a selfie with a rioter.

Anti-vaccine activists and conspiracy theorists were also present at the rally. Members of the right-wing Tea Party Patriots-backed group America's Frontline Doctors, including founder Simone Gold and its communications director, were arrested. She was later sentenced to 60 days in prison by a US federal court in Washington, DC, for illegally entering the US Capitol building.

The National Capital Region Threat Intelligence Consortium, a fusion center that aids the DHS and other federal national security and law enforcement groups, wrote that potentially violent individuals were joining the protest from the neo-Nazi group Atomwaffen Division and Stormfront. Despite of this information the Secret Service released an internal memo that stated there was no concern. The woman accused of stealing Nancy Pelosi's laptop was identified as member of the Atomwaffen.

State lawmakers 
At least nineteen Republican current and former state legislators were present at the event. All of them denied participating in acts of violence.

West Virginia Delegate Derrick Evans filmed himself entering the Capitol alongside rioters. On January8, he was charged by federal authorities with entering a restricted area; he resigned from the House of Delegates the next day. Amanda Chase was censured by the Virginia State Senate for her actions surrounding the event; in response she filed a federal lawsuit against that body. In May 2021, months after the riot, crowdsourced video analysis identified Pennsylvania state senator Doug Mastriano and his wife passing through a breached Capitol Police barricade, contradicting his previous claims; Mastriano dismissed these accusations as the work of "angry partisans" who were "foot soldiers of the ruling elite". Mastriano had also organized buses for people to travel from Pennsylvania to the Stop the Steal rally.

Trump's conduct 

Trump was in the West Wing of the White House at the time of the attack. He was "initially pleased" and refused to intercede when his supporters breached the Capitol. Staffers reported that Trump had been "impossible to talk to throughout the day". Concerned that Trump may have committed treason through his actions, White House Counsel Pat Cipollone reportedly advised administration officials to avoid contact with Trump and ignore any illegal orders that could further incite the attack to limit their prosecutorial liability under the Sedition Act of 1918.

Shortly after 2:00 p.m. EST, as the riot was ongoing and after Senators had been evacuated, Trump placed calls to Republican senators (first Mike Lee of Utah, then Tommy Tuberville of Alabama), asking them to make more objections to the counting of the electoral votes to try to overturn the election. Pence was evacuated by the Secret Service from the Senate chamber around 2:13. At 2:47 p.m., as his supporters violently clashed with police at the Capitol, Trump tweeted, "Please support our Capitol Police and Law Enforcement. They are truly on the side of our Country. Stay peaceful!" The Washington Post later reported that Trump did not want to include the words "stay peaceful".

During the riot, Chief of Staff Mark Meadows received messages from Donald Trump Jr., as well as Fox News hosts Sean Hannity, Laura Ingraham, and Brian Kilmeade, urging him to tell Trump to condemn the mayhem at the risk of his reputation. By 3:10, pressure was building on Trump to condemn supporters engaged in the riots. By 3:25, Trump tweeted, "I am asking for everyone at the U.S. Capitol to remain peaceful. No violence! Remember, WE are the Party of Law & Orderrespect the Law and our great men and women in Blue", but he refused to call upon the crowd to disperse. By 3:40, several congressional Republicans called upon Trump to more specifically condemn violence and to tell his supporters to end the occupation of the Capitol.

By 3:50 p.m., White House Press Secretary Kayleigh McEnany said the National Guard and "other federal protective services" had been deployed. At 4:06 p.m. on national television, President-elect Biden called for President Trump to end the riot. At 4:22 p.m., Trump issued a video message on social media that Twitter, Facebook, and YouTube later took down. In it, he repeated his claims of electoral fraud, praised his supporters and told them to "go home". At 6:25 p.m., Trump tweeted: "These are the things and events that happen when a sacred landslide election victory is so unceremoniously & viciously stripped away from great patriots who have been badly & unfairly treated for so long" and then issued a call: "Go home with love & in peace. Remember this day forever!" At 7:00, Rudy Giuliani placed a second call to Lee's number and left a voicemail intended for Tuberville urging him to make more objections to the electoral votes as part of a bid "to try to just slow it down".

In a televised January 6 Attack congressional hearing on June 9, 2022, Congresspersons Bennie Thompson and Liz Cheney stated that Trump did nothing to stop the attack despite numerous urgent requests that he intervene. They described Trump's inaction as a "dereliction of duty". Cheney said Trump had attempted to overturn a free and fair democratic election by promoting a seven-part conspiracy. According to Representative Thompson, "Jan. 6 was the culmination of an attempted coup, a brazen attempt, as one rioter put it shortly after Jan. 6, to overthrow the government ... The violence was no accident. It represents Trump's last stand, most desperate chance to halt the transfer of power." Trump, according to the committee, "lied to the American people, ignored all evidence refuting his false fraud claims, pressured state and federal officials to throw out election results favoring his challenger, encouraged a violent mob to storm the Capitol and even signaled support for the execution of his own vice president."

After the June 9 hearing, Congressman Tom Rice (R) reiterated his long held view of Trump's conduct saying, "He watched it happen. He reveled in it. And he took no action to stop it. I think he had a duty to try to stop it, and he failed in that duty."

Congressional conduct 
During the riots, Representative Lauren Boebert (R-CO) posted information about the police response and the location of members on Twitter, including the fact that Speaker Pelosi had been taken out of the chamber, for which she has faced calls to resign for endangering members. Boebert responded that she was not sharing private information since Pelosi's removal was also broadcast on TV.

Representative Ayanna Pressley (D-MA) left the congressional safe room for fear of other members there "who incited the mob in the first place".

While sheltering for hours in the "safe room"a cramped, windowless room where people sat within arms' length of each other – some Republican Congress members refused to wear face masks, even when their Democratic colleagues begged them to do so. During the following week, three Democratic members tested positive for COVID-19 in what an environmental health expert described as a "superspreader" event.

Law enforcement and National Guard response 

Assertions that Trump ordered the National Guard to deploy, and that Speaker Nancy Pelosi blocked deployment, are false. During the attack, Pelosi and House majority leader Steny Hoyer asked the defense secretary, and the governors of Virginia and Maryland, to deploy the National Guard. The January 6 committee concluded that prior to the attack Trump had floated the idea with his staff of deploying 10,000 National Guardsmen, though not to protect the Capitol, but rather "to protect him and his supporters from any supposed threats by left-wing counterprotesters."

Results

Casualties 

Ashli Babbitt, an unarmed 35-year-old Air Force veteran, was fatally shot in the upper chest by Lt. Michael Leroy Byrd while attempting to climb through the shattered window of a barricaded door.

Brian Sicknick, a 42-year-old responding Capitol Police officer, was pepper-sprayed during the riot and had two thromboembolic strokes the next day, after which he was placed on life support and soon died. The D.C. chief medical examiner found he died from a stroke, classifying his death as natural, and commenting that "all that transpired played a role in his condition".

Rosanne Boyland, 34, died of an amphetamine overdose during the riot rather than, as was initially reported, from being trampled by other rioters after her collapse, ruled accidental by the D.C. medical examiner's office. Her mother, Cheryl Boyland, told NBC News, "She was not doing drugs. The only thing they found was her own prescription medicine."

Kevin Greeson, 55, and Benjamin Philips, 50, died naturally from coronary heart disease and hypertensive heart disease.

Some rioters and 138 police officers (73 Capitol Police and 65 Metropolitan Police) were injured, of whom 15 were hospitalized, some with severe injuries. All had been released from the hospital by January 11.

Suicides

Morale among the Capitol Police plummeted after the riot. The department responded to several incidents where officers threatened to harm themselves.</noinclude>Four officers from various police departments who responded to the attack committed suicide in the days and months that followed: Capitol Police Officer Howard Charles Liebengood died by suicide three days after the attack, and D.C. Metropolitan Police Officer Jeffrey Smith, who was injured in the attack, died by suicide from a gunshot wound to the head at George Washington Memorial Parkway on January 15, after a misdiagnosed concussion. A former D.C. chief medical examiner hired by Smith's widow reported that the "acute, precipitating event that caused the death of Officer Smith was his occupational exposure to the traumatic events he suffered on January 6, 2021"; Smith's widow subsequently sued two of his alleged assailants, claiming they caused a traumatic brain injury with a crowbar or a heavy walking stick, leading to his death. In the immediate aftermath of the attack, some members of Congress and press reports included these two suicides in the number of reported casualties, for a total of seven deaths. In July, two more members of law enforcement who responded to the attack died by suicide: Metropolitan Police Officer Kyle Hendrik DeFreytag was found on July 10, and Metropolitan Police Officer Gunther Paul Hashida was found on July 29.

On August 5, 2021, Liebengood and Smith, along with Brian Sicknick and Billy Evans, were posthumously honored in a signing ceremony for a bill to award Congressional Gold Medals to Capitol Police and other January 6 responders. Their names are noted in the text of the bill, and Biden remarked on their deaths.

Damage 

Rioters stormed the offices of Nancy Pelosi, flipping tables and ripping photos from walls; the office of the Senate Parliamentarian was ransacked; art was looted; and feces were tracked into several hallways. Windows were smashed throughout the building, leaving the floor littered with glass and debris. Rioters damaged, turned over, or stole furniture. One door had "MURDER THE MEDIA" scribbled onto it. Rioters damaged Associated Press recording and broadcasting equipment outside the Capitol after chasing away reporters. Rioters also destroyed a display honoring the life of congressman and civil rights leader John Lewis. A photo of Representative Andy Kim (D–NJ) cleaning up the litter in the rotunda after midnight went viral.

The rioters caused extensive physical damage. Architect of the Capitol J. Brett Blanton, who leads the office charged with maintaining the Capitol and preserving its art and architecture, reported in congressional testimony from late February 2021 that the combined costs of repairing the damage and post-attack security measures (such as erecting temporary perimeter fencing) already exceeded $30million and would continue to increase. In May 2021, U.S. prosecutors estimated that the damage would cost almost $1.5 million. Interior damage from the riot included broken glass, broken doors, and graffiti; as well as defecation throughout the complex, on the floor and smeared on the walls; some statues, paintings, and furniture were damaged by pepper spray, tear gas, and fire extinguishing agents deployed by rioters and police.

The historic bronze Columbus Doors were damaged. Items, including portraits of John Quincy Adams and James Madison, as well as a marble statue of Thomas Jefferson, were covered in "corrosive gas agent residue"; these were sent to the Smithsonian for assessment and restoration. A 19th-century marble bust of President Zachary Taylor was defaced with what seemed to be blood, but the most important works in the Capitol collection, such as the John Trumbull paintings, were unharmed. On the Capitol's exterior, two 19th-century bronze light fixtures designed by Frederick Law Olmsted were damaged. Because the Capitol has no insurance against loss, taxpayers will pay for damage inflicted by the siege. Rare old-growth mahogany wood, stored in Wisconsin for more than one hundred years by the Forest Products Laboratory, was used to replace damaged wood fixtures and doors at the Capitol.

Laptop theft and cybersecurity concerns 
A laptop owned by Senator Jeff Merkley (D-OR) was stolen. A laptop taken from Speaker Pelosi's office was a "laptop from a conference room... that was only used for presentations", according to Pelosi's deputy chief of staff. Representative Ruben Gallego (D–AZ) said "we have to do a full review of what was taken, or copied, or even left behind in terms of bugs and listening devices". Military news website SOFREP reported that "several" secretlevel laptops were stolen, some of which had been abandoned while still logged in to SIPRNet, causing authorities to temporarily shut down SIPRNet for a security update on January7 and leading the United States Army Special Operations Command to re-authorize all SIPRNet-connected computers on January 8.

Representative Anna Eshoo (D–CA) said in a statement that "[i]mages on social media and in the press of vigilantes accessing congressional computers are worrying" and she had asked the Chief Administrative Officer of the House (CAO) "to conduct a full assessment of threats based on what transpired". The CAO said it was "providing support and guidance to House offices as needed".

The laptop computer taken from Pelosi's office was taken by
22-year-old Capitol rioter Riley Williams.  Williams was arrested and indicted on eight counts, including theft of government property, obstructing an official proceeding, and assaulting or resisting police. The indictment charged her with stealing the Hewlett-Packard laptop computer from Pelosi's office, subsequently selling or disposing of it, and boasting on social media of having taken Pelosi's "hard drives." The laptop has not been recovered. Pelosi's office stated that the computer was used only for presentations. Williams' boyfriend, who tipped off police, said that she had intended to send the stolen laptop to a friend in Russia for sale to Russian intelligence. Williams pleaded not guilty to the charges.

Events elsewhere

State capitols and cities 

Protests were again being held at state capitols in the week before the inauguration.

International 
Internationally, Trump's allegations of a "stolen" election found a small audience among conspiracy theorists and fringe groups. In Canada, there were small pro-Trump rallies on January 6 in Calgary, Toronto, and Vancouver. At the Vancouver rally, a demonstrator assaulted CBC photojournalist Ben Nelms. In Japan, a few hundred people in Tokyo rallied in support of Trump hours before the rally in Washington, D.C.; several people carried the U.S. flag and the Rising Sun Flag, a controversial symbol in East Asia because of its association with Japanese imperialism. The gathering in Tokyo was backed by Happy Science, a new religious movement that has been described as a cult. In New Zealand, a week after the Capitol attack, about 100 participants attended a "freedom rally" outside the New Zealand Parliament in Wellington. The "freedom rally" was organized by conspiracy theorist and New Zealand Public Party leader Billy Te Kahika and featured several participants with pro-Trump banners and flags.

Aftermath

Political, legal, and social repercussions 

The attack widely ridiculed by comedians. Chris Rock highlighted the attack in a “When did white men become victims?" routine, with comments including “Did you see the Capitol riots? What kind of White ‘Planet of the Apes’ s--- was that?”

Criminal charges

By February 1, 228 people from 39 states and DC had been charged with federal and/or DC offences. By April 23, 439 people had been charged. By early September, there were over 600 federal defendants, 10% of whom had pleaded guilty, and hundreds more arrests expected to come. By October 13, there were over 630 federal defendants and 100 guilty pleas, with BuzzFeed publishing a searchable table of the plea deals. On January 6, 2022, exactly one year following the attack, over 725 people had been charged for their involvement; the figure had increased to more than 950 one year later.

Most defendants face "two class-B misdemeanor counts for demonstrating in the Capitol and disorderly conduct, and two class-A misdemeanor counts for being in a restricted building and disruptive activity," according to BuzzFeed, and therefore most plea deals address those misdemeanors. Some defendants have been additionally charged with felonies. The median prison sentence, for those convicted thus far, is 45 days, with those who committed violence facing longer incarceration. Other punishments include home detention, fines, probation, and community service.  On January 13, 2022, 10 members of the Oath Keepers, including founder Stewart Rhodes, were arrested and charged with seditious conspiracy.

By March 2022, Justice Department investigations of participants in the attack had expanded to include activities of others leading up to the attack. A federal grand jury was empaneled that  issued at least one subpoena seeking records about people who organized, spoke at, or provided security at Trump rallies, as well as information about members of the executive and legislative branches who may have taken part in planning or executing the rallies, or attempted to "obstruct, influence, impede or delay" the certification of the election.

On June 17, 2022, after the January 6 Committee had held three hearings, Trump told a Faith and Freedom Coalition conference that he might run again for president and if elected he would "very very seriously" consider pardoning all those who stormed the Capitol. NBC News reported that Trump expressed no regrets about January 6 in the speech and "doubled down" on his unfounded claims about the election. On September 1, 2022, Trump similarly pledged to "very, very strongly" consider "full pardons with an apology" if reelected.

As of November 10, 2022, over 940 people had been charged in the Capitol breach.

On May 27, 2022, Judge Carl J. Nichols dismissed the most serious felony count in the Capitol prosecutions, 18 U.S.C. 1512(c), in the case of United States v. Garrett Miller;  the United States filed an appeal, which is pending. On October 27, 2022, Judge Timothy J. Kelly dismissed a felony count of 18 U.S.C. 1001(a)(2) in the case of United States v. Mark Ibrahim, represented by attorney Marina Medvin, who represents at least six other January 6 defendants.

On November 18, United States Attorney General Merrick Garland named Jack Smith as special counsel to investigate the January 6 attack and Trump's handling of government documents.

On November 29, a jury convicted Rhodes and Florida chapter Oath Keeper leader Kelly Meggs of seditious conspiracy. Three other members of the Oath Keepers were found not guilty of seditious conspiracy, but were convicted on other related charges.

Domestic reactions

International reactions

Analysis and terminology 

On the January 4, 2021, Steve Bannon, while discussing the planning for the upcoming events and speech by Trump on January 6 at The Ellipse, described it as a "bloodless coup".

A recent poll found that 20.5 percent of Americans believe that violence to achieve a political goal is sometimes justified. Nearly 12 percent expressed their willingness to use force to restore Trump to power.

Historians' perspectives 

While there have been other instances of violence at the Capitol in the 19th and 20th centuries, this event was the most severe assault on the building since the 1814 burning of Washington by the British Army during the War of 1812. The last attempt on the life of the vice president was a bomb plot against Thomas Marshall in July 1915. For the first time in U.S. history, a Confederate battle flag was flown inside the Capitol.

Douglas Brinkley, a historian at Rice University, remarked on how January 6 would be remembered in American history: "Now every Jan. 6, we're going to have to remember what happened... I worry if we lose the date that it will lose some of its wallop over time." He also wrote about Trump's responsibility during the attack: "There are always going to be puzzle pieces added to what occurred on Jan. 6, because the president of the United States was sitting there watching this on television in the White House, as we all know, allowing it to go on and on."

Speaking on January 6, 2022, historians Doris Kearns Goodwin and Jon Meacham  warned that the U.S. remained at "a crucial turning point."  Meacham commented, "What you saw a year ago today was the worst instincts of both human nature and American politics and it's either a step on the way to the abyss or it is a call to arms figuratively for citizens to engage." Goodwin added, "We've come through these really tough times before.  We've had lots of people who were willing to step up and put their public lives against their private lives. And that's what we've got to depend on today. That's what we need in these years and months ahead."

Robert Paxton considered the attack to be evidence that Trump's movement was an example of fascism, a characterization that Paxton had resisted up to that point.

See also 

 1983 United States Senate bombing
 2017 storming of the Macedonian Parliament
 2019 South Korean Capitol attack
 2022 German coup d'état plot
 2023 Brazilian Congress attack
 
 
 Demonstrations in support of Donald Trump
 
 
 Pre-election lawsuits related to the 2020 United States presidential election
 Protests against Donald Trump#Presidential inauguration
 Republican efforts to restrict voting following the 2020 presidential election
 Republican reactions to Donald Trump's claims of 2020 election fraud

Explanatory notes

References

External links

 November 4, 2021 DC DOC facility inspection report, Office of Congresswoman Marjorie Taylor Greene (GA-14)
 AFFIDAVIT IN SUPPORT OF CRIMINAL COMPLAINT AND ARREST WARRANT for John Earle Sullivan (including screenshots from Sullivan's video channels)
 Capitol riot arrests: who's been charged – U.S.-wide tracker database created and updated by USA Today
  Show can be found on CNN Live TV

Federal government
 Capitol Breach Cases, U.S. Attorneys, District of Columbia—A list of defendants charged in federal court in the District of Columbia related to crimes committed at the U.S. Capitol in Washington, D.C, on Wednesday, January 6, 2021
 
 FBI Seeking Information Related to Violent Activity at the U.S Capitol Building – FBI
 
 See also: 
 H. Res. 24 – Impeaching Donald John Trump, President of the United States, for high crimes and misdemeanors (article of impeachment adopted by the House on January 13, 2021)
 H.Res.31 – Condemning and censuring Representative Mo Brooks of Alabama (censure resolution introduced on January 11, 2021, by Representative Tom Malinowski, with two cosponsors)

Video
 What Parler Saw During the Attack on the Capitol (video archive from ProPublica)
 Day of Rage: How Trump Supporters Took the U.S. Capitol (visual investigation by The New York Times)
 PBS Frontline (April 2021): "American Insurrection" (video; 84:13); transcript
 News team decides to remind listeners of the attempted overthrow of the USA government by Republican elected officials on January 6, 2021 (WITF; The Washington Post; May 2, 2021).
 Federal Bureau of Investigation videos (Filter by keywords)

Timeline
  (Detailed timeline)
  (Video timeline)
 US Capitol stormed, collected news and commentary. BBC News Online.
 Timeline − details before, during and after the attack (The Washington Post; October 31, 2021).
  (MSNBC News; July 29, 2022) 
 "Donald Trump Is Not Above The Law" (The New York Times; August 26, 2022)

 
117th United States Congress
2021 controversies in the United States
2021 in American politics
2021 in Washington, D.C.
2021 protests
2021 riots
Attacks on buildings and structures in 2021
Attacks on buildings and structures in the United States
Attacks on the United States Congress
Controversies of the 2020 United States presidential election
Coups d'état and coup attempts in the United States
Crimes against police officers in the United States
Deaths by firearm in Washington, D.C.
Electoral violence
January 2021 crimes in the United States
Neo-fascist terrorism
Occupations (protest)
Political riots in the United States
Protests against results of elections
Riots and civil disorder in Washington, D.C.
Second impeachment of Donald Trump
Terrorist incidents in the United States in 2021
Terrorist incidents in Washington, D.C.
Trump administration controversies
Trumpism
United States Capitol Police
Articles containing video clips
21st-century rebellions
Insurgencies